State Highway 135 (SH 135) is a state highway in the U.S. state of Texas that runs from Jacksonville to near Gladewater.

History
SH 135 was designated on June 22, 1928, from Troup to the Rusk County Line. On March 19, 1930, it was extended to Gladewater, replacing SH 15A. On October 27, 1953, an extension to Jacksonville along FM 347 was signed but not designated. On February 20, 1963, SH 135 was rerouted concurrent with SH 42, with the old route being transferred to FM 918 and Spur 378. The extension to Jacksonville was official designated on August 29, 1990, completing the current route and cancelling this section of FM 347.

Major intersections

References

135
Transportation in Cherokee County, Texas
Transportation in Smith County, Texas
Transportation in Rusk County, Texas
Transportation in Gregg County, Texas
1928 establishments in Texas